Cao Yu (born August 15, 1974) is a Chinese cinematographer best known for his work on City of Life and Death, Kekexili: Mountain Patrol and See You Tomorrow. As a cinematographer, he became famous for his three collaborations with director Lu Chuan.

Early life and education
Cao was born on August 15, 1974, in Beijing. After graduating from Beijing Film Academy in 1997, he was assigned to Beijing Film Studio. When he was a college student, his greatest interest was to study equipment and Library. American Cinematographer is the most popular magazine he has borrowed from the university library. When he saw an article that he was interested in, he would copy it.

Career
Cao made his feature film debut with the 1997 comedy film Run Away, which earned him a Youth Film Fund award at the 54th Cannes Film Festival.

In 2001, he shot the feature film Chicken Poets, and won a Special Jury Prize at the Locarno Film Festival. That same year, he began to shot advertisement films.

In 2004, he shot Lu Chuan's Kekexili: Mountain Patrol, for which he received the Best Cinematography nomination at the 25th Golden Rooster Awards and received the Best Cinematography at the 41st Golden Horse Awards.

In 2009, Cao went on to serve as cinematographer for City of Life and Death, his second collaboration with director Lu Chuan. He won numerous awards, including the Best Cinematography at the 57th San Sebastian International Film Festival, the Best Cinematography at the 46th Golden Horse Awards, the Best Cinematography at the 4th Asian Film Awards, and the Best Cinematography at the 3rd Asia Pacific Screen Awards.

Cao was cinematographer for the 2010 romantic comedy film Color Me Love.

In 2012, he collaborated with Yang Shupeng on the action film An Inaccurate Memoir.

In 2015, he was selected as cinematographer for the 3D adventure action film Chronicles of the Ghostly Tribe, his third collaborated with director Lu Chuan.

In 2017, Cao won the Best Cinematography at the 36th Hong Kong Film Awards for his work in See You Tomorrow, and was nominated for Best Cinematography at the 54th Golden Horse Awards.

Personal life
In March 2011, Cao Yu began dating actress Yao Chen after they met in Color Me Love. On November 18, 2012, they married in Queenstown, New Zealand. On July 15, 2013, their son, nicknamed Xiao Tudou, was born in Beijing. Their daughter, nicknamed Xiao Moli, was born on November 9, 2016.

Film

Awards

References

1974 births
Artists from Beijing
Living people
Beijing Film Academy alumni
Chinese cinematographers